Slagnes is a village in Vanylven Municipality in Møre og Romsdal county, Norway. The small village of Slagnes is the site of Vanylven Church.

References

Villages in Møre og Romsdal
Vanylven